Mikael Marcimain (born 17 March 1970) is a Swedish film and television director. Marcimain has primarily directed advertisements and television dramas, for which he has received several awards. Notable in his filmography are the serials The Laser Man and How Soon Is Now?, which were made with cinematographer Hoyte van Hoytema. Marcimain's first feature film, the political thriller Call Girl, was released in autumn 2012.

Career 
Marcimain worked for nine years as an assistant director in the film industry before he was offered to make the one-hour film Broken Hearts as part of SVT Drama's TV series A Little Red Package (1999). His breakthrough came with the acclaimed miniseries Lasermannen (2005) and How Soon Is Now? (2007). He was awarded the Dagens Nyheter Culture Prize in 2007.

In June 2011, he received funding from the Swedish Film Institute to record his first feature film Call Girl, inspired by the so-called Geijer affair in the 1970s. The script was written by Marietta von Hausswolff von Baumgarten. For Call Girl, Marcimain won the international critics' organization FIPRESCI's debut award at the Toronto Film Festival 2012 and was nominated for nine Guldbagge Awards, of which it won three. Marcimain was nominated in the category Best Director. A scene in the film received a lot of attention in the media when relatives of former Swedish prime minister Olof Palme said that it portrayed him as a sex buyer of minors. Marcimain himself said that it was pure fiction, a feature film, and emphasized that he saw the film as a "women's film" that shows how power, the patriarchy, exploits the girls. 

In 2013, Marcimain started the filming of the film adaptation of Klas Östergren's novels Gentlemen and Gangsters, in which David Dencik plays the lead role as the dandy Henry Morgan. This will be the third time Marcimain and Dencik have worked together. 

Marcimain has stated that one of his future projects will be to film Stefan Spjut's novel Stallo, which takes place in the realm of fairy tales and is about trolls. 

He often works with actors Ruth Vega Fernandez, David Dencik, Simon J. Berger and Sverrir Gudnason and has cited Bo Widerberg as a great role model in his filmmaking.

Filmography

References

External links
 
 

1970 births
Living people
Artists from Stockholm
Swedish film directors